Joseph Henry Loveless (Born: December 3 or December 28, 1870 – Died: 1916 {speculative}.), also known as Charles Smith, Walter Currans, and Walter Cairns, was an American-born criminal who escaped prison after murdering his common-law wife, Agnes, with an axe in May of 1916. On August 26, 1979, his torso was discovered in a cave in Dubois, Idaho, followed by his limbs on March 26, 1991. However, it was not until late 2019 that the remains were positively identified as his. The positive identification was made possible by forensic genealogists.

Early life
Joseph Henry Loveless was born on December 3, 1870 
(according to some online sources, on December 28, 1870), at Payson, in what was then Utah Territory. His mother, Sarah Jane Scriggins, was from Massachusetts, while his father, Joseph Jackson Loveless, was from Indiana. Both of his parents were early Mormon pioneers from the Latter Day Saint movement.

Personal life 
In 1899, Loveless married Harriet "Hattie" Jane Savage in Salt Lake Cithttps://en.wikipedia.org/wiki/Soda_Springs,_Idahoy, Utah. He had one daughter with her, but in 1904 he was divorced by her. One year later in 1905, he was living in Idaho. Loveless married Agnes Octavia Caldwell, and had four children with her. Henry Loveless, his wife, and his children can be found listed in the 1910 thirteenth United States census located at Soda Springs, Idaho.

Criminal history of bootlegging, police arrests and escaping prison
In 1913 and in 1914, Loveless was arrested a number of times for bootlegging and escaping prison. Each time, Loveless would go to prison, he would escape by sawing through the bars of the prison cell. In March of 1916, An unidentified man, presumed to be Joseph Henry Loveless, was taken by police to prison by train, for bootlegging, Loveless was able to convince the train operator to stop. Loveless used that as a moment to escape the train and run away from the police.
The escape attempt failed and the Police captured Loveless and escorted him back to the train. Little did the police know that, after escorting Loveless out of the train, and locking him up in prison, he would escape, by sawing through the bars, like always. This was one of many of the prison escapes of Joseph Henry Loveless. Rumors has spread that Loveless’ common-law wife, Agnes, was also an bootlegger, just like Loveless, and was helping Loveless with bootlegging.

The murder of Agnes Loveless and Loveless’ escape from the prison cell
In the early May of 1916, Loveless allegedly murdered his wife Agnes with an axe in her bed while she was still asleep, while two of their children who were awake at the time, were present. Reports from the time identify her murderer as "Charles Smith", whom some additionally named as her husband, while their neighbours had testified that Loveless and his common-law wife, Agnes, had been fighting at the evening, several hours prior to the discovery of Agnes’ desceased body. Charles Smith was one of Loveless's many aliases. Loveless was arrested and sent to jail. At Agnes Loveless's funeral on May 16, 1916, one of their sons was quoted saying, "Papa never stayed in jail very long and he will soon be out". Only two days later, on, May 18, 1916, at around 5:30 PM, Loveless had broke out of the St. Anthony prison cell, by sawing through the prison cell bars, while his prison cell guards were out eating their supper. However, there is some speculation made that Loveless was assisted by an person or person(s), from outside of his prison cell.

The alleged sighting of Joseph Henry Loveless
Joseph Henry Loveless was reported, by some people, to be allegedly sighted living in a tent in the middle of the desert, at the outskirts of Dubois, Idaho in an unspecified date in 1916, shortly after his escape from prison. Though the alleged sighting, has never been proven or confirmed, to be true.

Death
The details of Loveless's death are unknown, and it is an open case with the Clark County Sheriff's Office as of January 2020. However, his final wanted poster after his jailbreak describes him as wearing some of the same clothes that were found with remains: a light colored hat, brown coat, red maroon sweater, and blue overalls over black trousers. The clothing found with the remains, included: Only a red maroon sweater, black trousers and a white-pinstriped collar shirt, which was not listed with the clothing on the wanted poster.  This caused Lee Bingham Redgrave, a forensic genealogist with the DNA Doe Project, to speculate that Loveless died in 1916. The cause of death is unknown, though multiple sharp tools were used to dismember his body. Samantha Blatt, bioarchaeologist at Idaho State University, speculated that Loveless may have been killed by his deceased wife's family as revenge for her murder.

Discovery and identification of remains
In 1979, a family searching for arrowheads in Buffalo Cave near Dubois, Idaho, discovered human remains in a burlap sack, consisting of a headless torso. In 1991, a girl found a hand in the same cave, prompting excavations which recovered both legs and an arm. Forensic researchers estimated that the man was of European descent, and around 40 years old at the time of death. Identification was thought nearly impossible due to the missing head. His post-mortem interval was initially estimated to be between 6 months and 5 years. In 2019, Idaho State University anthropologists, Samantha Blatt and Amy Michael, along with Clark County authorities solicited help from the DNA Doe Project, a nonprofit that seeks to identify previously unidentified deceased persons via forensic genealogy. Researchers constructed a genealogical tree for the unidentified remains. Because one of Loveless's grandfathers was a polygamist with four wives, the tree  was large, with hundreds of cousins and other relatives. Loveless was considered a plausible candidate, though, as his gravestone was found to be a cenotaph (not accompanied by his remains). Loveless's 87-year-old grandson was identified as living in California, and he agreed to take a DNA test, which confirmed that the remains were those of his grandfather Joseph Henry Loveless.

See also
List of unsolved murders

References

Further reading
 

1870 births
1916 deaths
American bootleggers
American escapees
American murderers
Criminals from Utah
Fugitives
Male murder victims
Outlaws of the American Old West
People from Payson, Utah
People murdered in Idaho
Unsolved murders in the United States